Hanfu accessories refers to the various form of fashion accessories and self-adornments used and worn with  throughout Chinese history.  consists of many forms of miscellaneous accessories, such as jewelries, , ribbons, shawls, scarves, and hand-held accessories, etc.

Jewellery 
Chinese jewellery, including Chinese carved jade jewellery, often features Chinese symbols and iconography, and auspicious symbols and images, which are themselves rooted in Chinese culture, legends and mythologies, and philosophy. These symbols often reveal the Chinese traditions which have guided the Chinese civilization for thousands of years and which currently continue to remain in use in present-days. 
Jade culture is an important aspect of Chinese culture, reflecting both the material and spiritual culture of the Chinese people. Jade is deeply ingrained in Chinese culture and played a role in every aspect of social life; it is also associated with positive qualities and aspects such as purity, excellence, and harmony. Jade is even more valued than gold in Chinese culture. Traditionally, jade jewellery especially often expressed positive sentiments and good wishes; and, jade itself were often gifted on important and/or special occasions such as wedding and child birth. 

Silver was another common materials in the making of Chinese ornaments and ritual items since ancient times; it also holds an irreplaceable place in Chinese culture and plays a significant role in being a carrier of Chinese traditional culture and in preserving ancient Chinese cultural heritage. Moreover, according to Chinese belief, silver could be used to avoid evil spirits and thus wearing silver ornaments and jewelries was believed to bring good luck to its wearer.

, on the other hand, was typically not used in traditional Chinese jewellery as it considered too bright and vulgar; and thus, it was generally avoided.

Bracelets 

Jade bracelets have been favoured by Chinese women since ancient times regardless of social ranking and has been one of the most important form of jewellery in Chinese culture. According to ancient Chinese beliefs, jade bracelets should be worn on the left hand as it is closest to the heart. Chinese women typically had at least three jade bracelets throughout her lifetime: the first one was given by her father as a little girl, the second is given to the girl by her mother when she gets married and which will be passed from generation to generation as a family heirloom, and the third one (regardless of the price and the quality) is given to the girl by her lover to express his love and his desire to protect her for a lifetime, which led to the saying, "no bracelet can't get married". Another jade bracelet may be given by a mother-in-law to her new daughter-in-law when she gets married. There is a belief in China which says that if a jade bracelet breaks, the death of its wearer has been supplanted by the broken bracelet. Jade bracelet continues to be prized and worn nowadays. It is also currently used as a form of fashion accessory used by hanfu enthusiasts.

Earrings 

Earrings in China originated in the Neolithic period; however, they were first used as decorations or amulets. Ancient  were made out  gold, jade, silver, ivory, marble, glass and crystal. Glass  became popular from the Han dynasty to the Southern and Northern dynasties due to its bright colours and due to its glittering characteristics and translucence.

These jade pendants gradually spread from the Emperor to officials and scholars, to women who would then hang it to their Chinese hairpins.

Based on archaeological findings, it appears that it was a popular trend for ancient women to only wear a single  (especially on the left ear) instead of pairs of earrings. During the Song dynasty that women started to piece their two ears and wore ; these earrings could be made with gold and pearls. Wearing earrings among Chinese women then became popular in the Ming and Qing dynasties. 

In the Ming dynasty, the practice of wearing a single earring on the ear was not customary for Chinese men, and such practices were typically associated with the non-Chinese people living along the northern and north-western borders; however, there is an exception:  young Chinese boys would wear a single ring-shaped earring attached to their ear as an amulet to protect them against evil spirits.

In Qing dynasty, Han Chinese women wore a single earring at each ears which contrasted from the Manchu women who had to wear three earrings at each ear. From the middle of the eighteenth century, Manchu women adopted the Han Chinese single earring despite breaking the Manchu dress code and the laws which prevented them from wearing Han Chinese women clothing; this frustrated the Qing emperors.

Rings 
Rings were initially used as decorations and finger protection when drawing bows since the Neolithic period. They were then given to the Empresses and imperial concubines in the Emperor's concubines to express or indicate their current physical conditions by the Emperor; by the time of Qin and Han dynasties, a gold ring worn on the left hand were used to express being on menstruation or being pregnant and thus that its wearer were unsuitable to serve the Emperor while a silver ring on the left hand expressed that its wearer was available to serve the Emperor; following a night with the Emperor, the silver ring would be moved from left to the right hand. This custom was then gradually spread to the nobles and officials before spreading to the civilians.

Rings which were mostly made of precious materials, such as jade, gold, and silver, were also bestowed presents to accomplished court officials and they were used as love token by couples. Rings later became one of the most important betrothal gift for a bride since the Southern Song dynasty.

Necklaces 

Yingluo is currently a common necklace accessory used by hanfu enthusiasts. It is a ring-shaped ornament developed in ancient China, which is hung on the neck and chest, worn on the head, arms and legs. It is mainly made of pearls, precious stones and precious metals. At first, it was used as a Buddhist ornament, but later it was widely adopted as a necklace and head wear in Chinese women's clothing.There is also a custom of wearing a necklace with a longevity lock pendant, . These lock charms were sometimes personally tied around the necks of children by Buddhist or Taoist priests.

Pendants and charms

Longevity locks 

The longevity lock is known as  has an important form of amulet for children for thousand of years in Chinese culture; according to Chinese beliefs, the  protect children from evil spirits and bad luck by locking its wearer's soul and life inside of the lock. The  is often made with precious materials, such as gold, silver (which is also believed to ward off evil and bring good luck), and jade, and having auspicious words carved on it. The  is also a manifestation of the blessing from the older generation who hoped that the child would live a long time (longevity) and remove illness (health).

Jade pendants 
 and had a rigid and specific rules attached to its use. Some jade pendants also combined jades in the shape of dragons, phoenixes, humans, human-dragons, and animals, etc. In the Qing dynasty, it was popular for women to wear green, translucent jade jewelries; pendants which were carved in the shape of a curving dragon was popular.

The  appeared thousands of years ago and were initially only worn by nobles, but with time, it was gradually adopted by all women regardless of their social ranks. The  also used to be an indicator of elegance and etiquette in ancient times: if the behaviour of its wearer is discourteous (i.e. walking too fast), the  would sound loud; and thus, it would remind the wearer to mind his manners and elegance; on the other hand, if its wearer behave appropriately, the  would sound melodic and pleasant. This is also explained in the chapter 《》in the :It is currently used as a form of fashion accessory used by  enthusiasts.

Press lapels 

They also wore other forms of pendants, such as pendants made of metal filigree in the shape of potpourri container which would be filled with fragrant herbs and long silver pendants with small silver charms which were filled with bells which would frightened evil spirits away when they tickled as they wore. They would also hang  (purses) on the top button of their jacket.

A  is a type of 18-beads bracelet which originated from the japamala. The  sometimes have hanging buckles; they would be hung on the right lapels of upper clothing or could be worn around the wrist like a regular bracelet. There were no strict regulations on its wearing etiquette.

Belts, girdles, and sashes 

Belts were used as accessories for various civil and military officials, and they were used to distinguish their social ranks.

Neck and shoulder accessories, and ribbons

Portable accessories

Purses and fragrance sachet 
, Chinese purses or sachet, are currently used as a form of fashion accessory used by hanfu enthusiasts. They are often embroidered and can be decorated with tassels.

(), also known as "fish-shaped tally bag", is a fish-shaped . It was worn or hung on the belt of the court clothing It was used from the Tang to the Ming dynasty.

Hand-held Fans 

Historically, fans have played an important aspect in the life of the Chinese people. The Chinese have used hand-held fans as a way to relief themselves during hot days since the ancient times; the fans are also an embodiment of the wisdom of Chinese culture and art. They were also used for ceremonial purposes and as a sartorial accessory. So far, the earliest fans that had been found date to the Spring and Autumn and Warring States Period; these were made of either bamboo or feathers. The arts of fan making eventually progressed to the point that by the Jin dynasty, fans could come in different shapes and could be made in different materials.

, silk round-shaped fans, also known as "fans of reunion", is a type of "rigid fan". These types of fans were mostly used by women in the Tang dynasty and was later introduced into Japan. These round fans remained mainstream even after the growing popularity of the folding fans. Round fans with Chinese paintings and with calligraphy became very popular in the Song dynasty. 

In 988 AD,  was first introduced in China by a Japanese monk from Japan as a tribute during the Northern Song dynasty; these folding fans became very fashionable in China by the Southern Song dynasty. The folding fans later became very fashionable in the Ming dynasty.

Livistona chinensis).

Oil-paper umbrella 
Oil-paper umbrella is a common fashion accessory among Hanfu enthusiasts, who often used for photo-shooting purposes.

Musical instruments 

Weapons 

In 583 AD during the Sui dynasty, civilian ownership of swords and spears were banned by Emperor Wen of Sui; the ban of daggers, knives, hunting forks and hooks followed by the year 604. This ban was soon lifted following the founding of the Tang dynasty, and according to the Tang legal code, people were allowed to carry light weapons, bows and arrows, swords, shields, and short spears and were only banned from using professional military weapons. This led to a cultural shift in the Tang dynasty where gallantry culture rose in popularity. This cultural shift also changed the symbol of swords in society, which became symbols of strength, courage, masculinity, righteousness. It thus became fashionable to carry swords as well as short weapons, such as knives and daggers. Sending swords as gifts to friends were also performed by some scholars: 

Nowadays, swords remain present in traditional Chinese arts, such as the Chinese dance and Chinese opera. Sword dance  and knife dance both evolved from Chinese martial arts, with the records of sword dance appearing as early as the Han dynasty.

Tally and tablet 

Cosmetics and  makeup 
Cosmetics have a very long history in China but their origins are unclear. The cosmetic industry in China may have potentially originated in the Spring and Autumn period.

Red makeup was an important colour for facial cosmetics for the Chinese people; for example, in the Tang dynasty, red makeup included rouge and lip glosses made of cinnabar.

Cosmetic powder 
Cosmetic powder in China was made out of rice since ancient times and appears to have predated the use of lead powder. In the Han dynasty, women were not the only ones who used cosmetic powder, men also used it and this custom of men applying powder did not decline even during the Six dynasties period. By the time of the Six dynasties period, lead powder had become a mainstream cosmetics among the aristocrats and the practice of using lead powder became established by the Tang dynasty period.

Red makeup powder 

The  was a makeup powder which was applied on the cheeks. In the Tang dynasty, women would apply rouge on their cheeks directly under their eyes.

White makeup powder and whitening skin product 

White powder to whiten the face made from rice was popular in China around 1500BC. The use of white makeup powder made of freshwater pearls can be traced back to the Northern Song dynasty. In ancient times, not only the face had to be whitened but any exposed areas of the body such as hands, arms, and neck also had to be whitened. There was also a custom of applying powder on non-exposed body areas, such as the chest, shoulders, and back which can be traced back to the Han dynasty period.

The love for white skin in present-day China has nothing to do with racism. Light skin was a desirable trait for Asian communities, including the Chinese people, long before any contact with the Europeans instead it was due to it association with social economic and/or occupational status class, a concept which can be traced back to the Han dynasty when commoners, such as farmers and labourers, would work outside all day which resulted into darker, tanned skin tone, while those who came from a wealthier families could spend their days indoors and were spared from having to work outside in the sun. This belief continues to remain rooted in present-day China where white skin is believed to represent being part of the elite class; and thus, Chinese people continue to take a lot of measures to ensure that their skin remain white and beautiful. While Chinese people have traditionally favoured light skin tone as part of their traditional Chinese aesthetic; they did not favour the white skin tone of European people which was looked down as being pale and unhealthy as the colour white was the symbolic colour of death and mourning in traditional Chinese culture. Similarly, the association of white skin and beauty was introduced from China to Japan in the Tang dynasty, a period when Japan was heavily influenced by Chinese culture and not under Western influence; for example, during the Nara period (710–794 AD), Japanese women started to use whitening powder under the influence of the Chinese culture; and since then, the standard beauty ideal ideal in Japan is light skin.

Yellow powder 
From the 6th century through the Tang dynasty, it was fashionable for women to apply powder to their foreheads, especially yellow powder or pollen.

Nails 
Nail polish was a popular cosmetic enhancement in early China and can be traced back to approximately 3000 BC. Chinese royalty used nail polishes which were gold, silver, black and red in colour and were made with bee wax, gum Arabic, and egg. Chinese aristocrats also coloured their nails in red and black with nail polishes which were made up of egg white, bee wax, and gelatin. While the lower classes of society were forbidden from painting their nails in bright colours.

Ancient-style  makeup

Modern  makeup 
Red makeup remain popular in Modern  makeup of the 21st century with the use of red and/or pink eyeshadow.

See also 
 Hanfu
 List of Hanfu
 Hanfu movement
List of Hanfu headwear

Gallery

References 

Hanfu